My Little Girl is a 1986 American drama film directed by Connie Kaiserman.

My Little Girl may also refer to:
 "My Little Girl" (Crickets song), a 1962 song by The Crickets
 "My Little Girl", a song by Roxy Music on the 1979 album Manifesto (Roxy Music album)
 "My Little Girl" (Tim McGraw song), a 2006 country music song